Anatoliy Yuryevich Baranov (born December 18, 1959) is a Russian journalist and politician.
He is the editor-in-chief of the Форум.мск.
From 2003 to 2007, he was the editor-in-chief of the official website of the Communist Party of the Russian Federation (cprf.ru).
Until 2012, member of the Board of Left Front (Russia).
He is a member of the Politburo of the United Communist Party.

He received a Medical Degree.
Baranov started his career as a journalist in the newspaper Moskovskij Komsomolets in the 1980s.
From 1993 to 1996, he worked for the newspaper Pravda.

He was a member of the Communist Party of the Russian Federation (until 2007). CPRF and Gennady Zyuganov accused him of Trotskyism. He left the party.

On March 10, 2010 he signed an appeal of the Russian opposition stating "Putin must go".

He was awarded a Medal "In Commemoration of the 850th Anniversary of Moscow".

Anatoliy Baranov served as a prototype for one of the characters – Anatoliy Ovtsov, a journalist of the newspaper Moskovskij Bogomolets, which is very similar to the famous Moskovskij Komsomolets  – in the novel Journalists by Sergei Aman.  Also Baranov served as a prototype for one of the main characters – Anatoliy Barinov, a politiсion from Moscow – in the thriller novel The World According to Novikoff  by Andrei Gusev.

References

Russian communists
1959 births
Living people
Russian opinion journalists
Russian politicians
Moscow State University alumni
Pravda people
Communist Party of the Russian Federation members